Sayat Demissie (born 1986) is an Ethiopian singer, actress, model and fashion designer. She debuted as a model at age 17, placing in the top 20 in the 2004 Ethiopian Beauty Queens. She began acting in the film Sara (2006). Sayat released her debut album in 2011 and has acted in a number of movies and television series since. She returned to music with a critically acclaimed music video for her song Eskesher in 2019.

Early life
Sayat Demissie was born in 1986 in Addis Ababa, Ethiopia. She is the last of four children in the family. In 2006, she completed high school.

Career 
Sayat began her modeling career at age 17. She placed in the top 20 in the 2004 Ethiopian Beauty Queens. Sayat entered the film industry in 2006 film Sara while working with Tilahun Zewege. She acted in films such as Laundry Boy, Selanchi (2009), Adamt (2013) and German film Der weiße Äthiopier (2015). Afterwards, Sayat began a musical career after releasing her album Kifel Sost Volume 1, containing her hit "Tew Maneh". In 2011, she released "Hasabun Mesrek". After a hiatus, Sayat released a comeback track titled "Eskesher" on 1 November 2019. The song recapitulates her musical career; reflecting on the hardships of life. In 2021, Sayat joined musicians like Fikiraddis Nekatibeb, Zeritu Kebede, Kuku Sebsebe, and released a single "Yehager Kasma". From 2021 to 2022, she played as Enana on television drama series. Eregnaye In 2022 the show was recognized by both the Guma Awards and the Leza Awards. ARTS TV.

Personal life
Sayat is a vocal supporter of women's rights. She has spoken openly about the lack of safety for women, as well as the importance of women supporting other women. In her interviews she has opened up about how much hard work and versatility her work requires and the need for self acceptance.  In a February 2020 interview with Rakeb and Hanna on EBS Show, she spoke about the passion she puts into her music, and her collaboration with her sister for her symbolic music video for "Eskesher"

Selected discography
Albums

 Singles

Filmography

Television

References

External links
 Sayat Demissie on IMDb
 Sayat Demissie on Yageru

1986 births
Living people
21st-century Ethiopian actresses
21st-century Ethiopian women singers
People from Addis Ababa
Ethiopian female models
Ethiopian women activists